Khategaon is a town and a nagar palika in Dewas district in the Indian state of Madhya Pradesh. Khategaon is a major agricultural production area in Madhya Pradesh. Earlier, Khategaon was called Harigarh. , the most notable personality of Khategaon, There is also acute shortage of electricity and water in the village due to which the people face a lot of difficulties in their day to day work.

Demographics 
 India census, Khategaon had a population of 21,018. Males constitute 52.5% of the population and females 47.5%.

References 

Farmer's Protest

Cities and towns in Dewas district